The River Tillingbourne (also known as the Tilling Bourne) runs along the south side of the North Downs and joins the River Wey at Guildford. The source is a semi-natural uninhabited area. The catchment is situated on sandstone which has a low rate of weathering.

Geography
The Tillingbourne initially flows northward for  down the northern slopes of Leith Hill over a series of weirs and cascades, before turning west to run for  through Abinger Hammer and Chilworth towards the River Wey at Shalford. The river is classified as a subsequent stream, since its course is determined by the direction of the stratum of softer rock for the majority of its length.

The river has four principal tributaries: the Friday Street stream joins at Wotton House; the Holmbury St Mary stream joins at Abinger Hammer; the Sherbourne Brook drains the Silent Pool and Sherbourne Pond and the Law Brook joins near Postford.

Industry
From the 17th to the mid 20th centuries the Tillingbourne valley was a major industrial area due to its closeness to London and the ease of transport via the Wey and the Thames. The river was used to power a relatively large number of  mills in the area.  Some 24 mill sites have been identified along the course of the river, used for such diverse industries as gunpowder, paper making for bank-notes,  iron-working, wire-making, fulling, tanning and pumping water, as well as the more conventional flour, grist and malt milling. Some of the earliest gunpowder mills were those set up in 1626 by The East India Company at Chilworth.

John Evelyn wrote in his diary in 1676:

Not every one was so impressed, William Cobbett wrote:

Present day users include a trout farm, watercress beds, a business growing reeds and a gin distillery.

The river passes through the Albury estate which operates recreational fisheries at Weston fishery, Vale End fishery and Powder Mills fishery. The river's natural course has been diverted slightly here for the purposes of the estate.

The Shalford pumping station, close to the junction with the Wey, provides between 4 and 7 million gallons of water per day to supply Godalming and parts of Guildford.

Mills
Brookmill
Friday Street Upper Mill (Friday Street Stream tributary)
Friday Street Mill (Friday Street Stream tributary)
Wotton House Mill
Crane's Mill, Abinger
Paddington Mill, now converted to private housing
Abinger Hammer Mill
Sutton Mill (Holbury St Mary Stream tributary)
Gomshall Mill, now a pub
Gomshall Tannery
Netley Mill, also known as Shere Mill
Shere Lower Mill
Shere West Mill
Albury Park Mill
Albury Mill
Postford Upper Mill
Postford Lower Mill, renamed Albury Mill in the 20th Century.  Also known as Bottings Mill.
Postford House Mill
Chilworth Gunpowder Mills, divided between the Lower, Middle and Upper Works.
Chilworth Great Mill
Chilworth Little Mill
East Shalford Mill
Shalford Mill, now owned by the National Trust

Environment

The River Tillingbourne supports a fish population of both wild brown trout and coarse fish. The Environment Agency has been working with local fishermen to improve the habitat for these fish by recreating a pool and riffle habitat and by cutting back overhanging vegetation. The signal crayfish is a recent invasive species. The river and its environs are often studied by students from nearby field studies centres, such as Sayers Croft and Juniper Hall.  There are on-going problems with invasive plants caused by phosphate enrichment due to waste-water treatment from sewage works in addition to agricultural run-off.

The river was championed by the Victorian landscape painter, Lewis Pinhorn Wood, who lived in Shere from 1884 to 1897, and painted extensively along its banks with scenes including The Silent Pool, Twilight (1888) and Evening on the Tillingbourne (1889).

The writer, Ralph Lawrence, recalls hearing the guns on the Western Front while walking in Hurtwood on the southern slopes of the valley .

Water quality
The Environment Agency measure water quality of the river systems in England. Each is given an overall ecological status, which may be one of five levels: high, good, moderate, poor and bad. There are several components that are used to determine this, including biological status, which looks at the quantity and varieties of invertebrates, angiosperms and fish. Chemical status, which compares the concentrations of various chemicals against known safe concentrations, is rated good or fail.

The water quality of the Tillingbourne was as follows in 2019:

Other Notable Features
Tillingbourne Waterfall
Newlands Corner affords panoramic views over the valley.
Silent Pool
St Martha's Hill above Chilworth also provides a panorama of the valley.

References

Rivers of Surrey
1Tillingbourne